
Gmina Sobolew is a rural gmina (administrative district) in Garwolin County, Masovian Voivodeship, in east-central Poland. Its seat is the village of Sobolew, which lies approximately 18 kilometres (11 mi)
east of Garwolin and 71 km (44 mi) south-east of Warsaw.

Villages
Gmina Sobolew contains the villages and settlements of:
 Anielów
 Chotynia, Chotynia-Kolonia
 Chrusty
 Drobina
 Emerytka, Godzisz
 Gończyce, Grabniak
 Kaleń Drugi, Kaleń Pierwszy
 Karolinów
 Kobusy
 Kownacica
 Leonorów
 Mazurki
 Michałki
 Milanów
 Nowa Krępa
 Nowiny Sobolewskie
 Ostrożeń Drugi
 Ostrożeń Pierwszy
 Poręby
 Przyłęk
 Sobolew
 Sokół
 Teofilów
 Trzcianka
 Uśniak
 Walerków
 Wiktorzyn
 Zaprzytnica

Neighbouring gminas
Gmina Sobolew is bordered by the gminas of Górzno, Łaskarzew, Maciejowice, Trojanów and Żelechów.

References
Polish official population figures 2006

Sobolew
Garwolin County